Micracanthia humilis is a species of shore bug in the family Saldidae. It is found in the Caribbean Sea, Central America, North America, Oceania, and South America.

References

External links

 

Articles created by Qbugbot
Insects described in 1832
Saldoidini